Anderson Severino (born September 17, 1994) is a Dominican professional baseball pitcher who is a free agent.

Career

New York Yankees
On June 1, 2013, Severino signed a minor league contract with the New York Yankees organization. Severino made his professional debut in 2014 with the Dominican Summer League Yankees, posting an ERA of 3.97 in 4 games, 2 of them starts. In 2015, Severino played for the Gulf Coast Yankees, pitching to a 2.61 ERA in 11 appearances. He returned to team the following season, but struggled to a 6.29 ERA in 48.2 innings pitched across another 11 appearances. In 2017, Severino was moved to the bullpen and split the year between the DSL Yankees, GCL Yankees, and the rookie-level Pulaski Yankees. In 15 appearances between the three affiliates, Severino accumulated a stellar 1.59 ERA with 24 strikeouts in 22.2 innings of work. In 2018, Severino split the season between the Single-A Charleston RiverDogs and the High-A Tampa Tarpons, pitching to a cumulative 3.74 ERA with 39 strikeouts in 30 contests.

In 2019, Severino split the year between Tampa and the GCL Yankees, recording a 4.71 ERA with 31 strikeouts in 28.2 innings of work across 16 games. Severino did not play in a game in 2020 due to the cancellation of the minor league season because of the COVID-19 pandemic. He elected minor league free agency following the season on November 2, 2020.

Chicago White Sox
On November 17, 2020, Severino signed a minor league contract with the Chicago White Sox organization. In 2021, Severino played for the Triple-A Charlotte Knights and Double-A Birmingham Barons, posting a 2.36 ERA with 53 strikeouts in 45.2 innings pitched across 40 appearances. The White Sox added Severino to their 40-man roster following the 2021 season on November 4, 2021. He was assigned to Triple-A Charlotte to begin the 2022 season.

On April 12, 2022, Severino was promoted to the major leagues for the first time. Severino made his MLB debut on April 14, pitching in relief of José Ruiz against the Seattle Mariners. Severino got out of Ruiz's bases loaded jam by striking out Adam Frazier, the first batter he faced.

On September 9, 2022, Severino was designated for assignment. He elected free agency on November 10, 2022.

See also
 List of Major League Baseball players from the Dominican Republic

References

External links

1994 births
Living people
Birmingham Barons players
Charleston RiverDogs players
Charlotte Knights players
Chicago White Sox players
Dominican Republic expatriate baseball players in Puerto Rico
Dominican Republic expatriate baseball players in the United States
Dominican Summer League Yankees players
Gigantes de Carolina players
Gulf Coast Yankees players
Leones del Escogido players
Major League Baseball pitchers
Major League Baseball players from the Dominican Republic
Pulaski Yankees players
Sportspeople from Santo Domingo
Tampa Tarpons players